Lee Claire Dashner (April 25, 1887 – December 16, 1959) was a Major League Baseball pitcher who played for one season. He played for the Cleveland Naps for one game on August 4, 1913.

External links

1887 births
1959 deaths
Cleveland Naps players
Cincinnati Cams players
Major League Baseball pitchers
Baseball players from Illinois
Columbia Comers players
Toledo Mud Hens players
Lexington Colts players
Maysville (minor league baseball) players
Topeka Jayhawks players
Topeka Savages players
Fort Dodge Dodgers players
Ironton Nailers players
People from Monroe County, Illinois